Dianne Fromholtz Balestrat (née Fromholtz; born 10 August 1956) is an Australian former professional tennis player who reached a highest singles ranking of world No. 4 in 1979.

Career
Fromholtz began playing tennis at the age of seven. She left school at the age of 16 to play in international tournaments. She turned pro in 1973 and joined the WTA Tour.

At the age of 17, she actively participated in the professional tennis circuit, winning the singles title at a dozen tournaments in 1973, but the rules at the time did not permit prize money to be paid to participants under 18 years of age.

She reached the finals of the Australian Open in January 1977, losing to fellow Australian Kerry Melville Reid in two sets. She was a semifinalist at the French Open in 1979 and 1980. She also reached the semifinals of the US Open in 1976.

Fromholtz won 8 WTA Tour singles titles and reached a career-high ranking of World No. 4 in 1979. Partnering with Helen Gourlay Cawley, she won the Australian Open women's doubles in January 1977. She had career wins over Chris Evert, Martina Navratilova, Billie Jean King, Evonne Goolagong Cawley, Margaret Court, Virginia Wade, Pam Shriver, and Gabriela Sabatini. She holds an 8–7 career record over King.

Fromholtz met French businessman Claude Balestrat at a New Year's Eve party in 1981, and the couple wed in Dural on 26 December 1982.

On 30 August 2000, Fromholtz was awarded the Australian Sports Medal for her commitment to tennis.

Grand Slam finals

Singles: (1 runners-up)

Doubles: (1 title)

Mixed doubles: (1 runner-up)

WTA career finals

Singles: 24 (8–16)

Doubles: 12 (5-1–6)

Grand Slam singles tournament timeline

Note: The Australian Open was held twice in 1977, in January and December.

See also
 Performance timelines for all female tennis players who reached at least one Grand Slam final

References

External links
 
 
 
 

1956 births
Living people
Australian female tennis players
Australian Open (tennis) champions
Sportspeople from Albury
Sportswomen from New South Wales
Tennis players from Sydney
Recipients of the Australian Sports Medal
Grand Slam (tennis) champions in women's doubles